Millville is an unincorporated rural hamlet in Ray County, in the U.S. state of Missouri and part of the Kansas City metropolitan area. 

The community is on Missouri Route K and is approximately 8.5 miles northeast of Richmond. The East Fork of Crooked River flows past the west side of the community.

History
Millville was platted in 1873, and named for a watermill near the original town site.  A post office called Millville was established in 1849, and remained in operation until 1906.

References

Unincorporated communities in Ray County, Missouri
Unincorporated communities in Missouri